Marila saramaccana is a species of flowering plant in the Calophyllaceae family. It is found only in Suriname.

References

saramaccana
Endemic flora of Suriname
Vulnerable plants
Taxonomy articles created by Polbot